Unto the Sons is a 1992 book by Gay Talese.  The book traces the origins of Talese's own family, beginning with his great-grandfather in Maida, Italy, his grandfather who immigrated to Pennsylvania and Talese's father, who immigrated to the United States separately following World War I.

1992 non-fiction books
Works by Gay Talese
Alfred A. Knopf books
Non-fiction books about Italian-American culture